Hyalospheniidae is a group of testate amoebae and the sole family of the infraorder Hyalospheniformes. Hyalospheniid testate amoebae are considered important bioindicators, which is why they are frequently used for environmental monitoring and their fossils are studied to investigate the paleoecology.

Phylogeny
The following cladogram illustrates the evolutionary relationships between all hyalospheniid genera found through phylogenetic analysis, with the exception of Porosia, a genus excluded from the analysis that appears to be closely related to Certesella and is therefore placed next to it in the cladogram.

Classificaton
The current taxonomy of the family recognizes 14 genera:
 Infraorder Hyalospheniformes Lahr et al. 2019
 Family Hyalospheniidae Schulze 1877 emend. Kosakyan & Lara 2014
 Alabasta Duckert et al., 2018
 Alocodera Jung, 1942
 Apodera Loeblich & Tappan, 1961
 Certesella Loeblich & Tappan, 1961
 Cornutheca Kosakyan et al., 2016
 Gibbocarina Kosakyan et al., 2016
 Hyalosphenia Stein, 1859
 Longinebela Kosakyan et al., 2016
 Mrabella Kosakyan et al., 2016
 Nebela Leidy, 1874
 Padaungiella Lara et Todorov, 2012
 Planocarina Kosakyan et al., 2016
 Porosia Jung, 1942
 Quadrulella Cockerell, 1909

References

Tubulinea
Amoebozoa families